Connecticut's 28th State Senate district elects one member of the Connecticut State Senate. It consists of the towns of Fairfield, Easton, Newtown, and parts of Westport and Weston. It has been represented by Republican Tony Hwang since 2015.

Recent elections

2020

2018

2016

2014

2012

References

28